Rose Katherine Morton-Sayre (December 3, 1925 – November 12, 1999) was an American mathematician known for her work in fluid mechanics. The Morton number, a dimensionless parameter used to describe bubbles, is named after her.

Morton was born in Albemarle, North Carolina. She graduated from the University of North Carolina at Greensboro (at that time a women's college) with a bachelor's degree in mathematics in 1948; at the university, she was president of the Square Circle Club. She worked at the David Taylor Model Basin, a test facility for the U. S. Navy, from 1949 to 1960.

Her husband was mechanical engineer Clifford L. Sayre, Jr., who also worked at the David Taylor Model Basin from 1956 to 1960.

Selected publications

References 

1925 births
1999 deaths
20th-century American mathematicians
American women mathematicians
Fluid dynamicists
University of North Carolina at Greensboro alumni
20th-century women mathematicians
20th-century American women